Lizzie Higgins (20 September 1929 – 20 February 1993) was an Aberdeenshire ballad singer.

Early life 
Born Elizabeth Ann Higgins in Guest Row, Aberdeen, she was the daughter of settled Travellers the piper Donald "Donty" Higgins and the singer Jeannie Robertson. In 1941, after her school was twice bombed during World War II, Lizzie moved with her mother to the rural town of Banchory, where the local children bullied her for her heritage. She was so unhappy in this environment that she left school at fifteen despite the pleasure she gained from studying. She moved back to Aberdeen to fillet fish and take seasonal agricultural labouring.

Career 
She did not take up public singing until 1967 because she did not wish to distract public attention from her mother. "The folk scene claimed Jeannie. I didnae want it tae claim me", she explained later. She debuted at the Aberdeen Folk Song Festival, persuaded to sing by folk song collector Peter Hall.

Personal life 
She married Brian Youlden. She died from throat cancer in 1993.

Discography
 The Princess of the Thistle (12" LP record. Topic 12 T 185. Mono. Recorded by Bill Leader, notes by Peter Hall. London, Topic Records Ltd., 1969)
 "Up and Awa' wi' the Laverock (Topic, 1975)
 "What a Voice" [12" LP] Lismor Folk Records 1985
 In Memory of Lizzie Higgins 1929 – 1993 (Musical Traditions, 2006)

See also
Scottish Travellers

References

 

1929 births
1993 deaths
Scottish folk singers
Scottish Travellers
20th-century Scottish women singers
Topic Records artists